Branch insignia may refer to:

 Iranian Army Branch Insignia
 Iranian Police Branch Insignia
 Romanian Armed Forces ranks and insignia
 Ukrainian Armed Forces branch insignia
 United States Army branch insignia